The Wonder Ballroom is a music venue located in northeast Portland, Oregon. Prior to opening in 2004, the building (originally constructed in 1914) was occupied by the Ancient Order of Hibernians, the Catholic Youth Organization, the Portland Boxing School, the American Legion organization, and a community center eventually known as the Collins Center. In 2005, the building was listed on the National Register of Historic Places as the Hibernian Hall for its "historic and architectural significance".

History
Originally built in 1914 for the Ancient Order of Hibernians, an organization committed to immigration reform and the preservation of Irish culture, the building known today as the Wonder Ballroom was designed by the architecture firm of Jacobberger & Smith. The group's first meeting in the newly constructed building was held on September 10, 1914. After membership of the group fell, the building was turned over to the Catholic Church in 1936. The Catholic Youth Organization and Portland Boxing School occupied the building until about 1941. Ownership of the building was transferred to the American Legion Organization in 1938, allowing the American Legion Navy Post No. 101 to operate in the space during World War II. In 1948, a renovation in the auditorium resulted in lower ceilings. The building was sold to Evelyn Collins in 1956, who hoped to create a community center and day care facility. The following year, another remodel took place to comply with new building codes, and windows were added to the east side of the hall. Upon completion, the center operated for more than 25 years as the Community Center Nursery, the Christian Community Center, and eventually the Collins Center.

By 2002, the building was shuttered due to a lack of funds by the Collins estate. In 2004, the building was purchased by Mark Woolley and Chris Monlux and remodeled for the music venue, and one year later it was placed on the National Register of Historic Places as the Historic Hibernian Hall for its "historic and architectural significance".

Description

The Wonder Ballroom's auditorium is painted in "subtle, earthy tones" and is lit by a gothic-style chandelier and sconces. The  Mark Woolley Gallery, once the Hibernians' assembly room, houses works by local artists.

Under Wonder Lounge
The basement level of the building features a café called Under Wonder Lounge (formerly Café Wonder), which offers cocktails and "sophisticated comfort food" such as macaroni and cheese, burgers, meatloaf, and chicken croquettes. In 2006, Justin Sanders of The Portland Mercury described its menu as a "pleasing array of good ol' fashioned mama's kitchen down-hominess with just enough artful flourishes to keep things interesting."

See also
 Knights of Columbus Building (Portland, Oregon), another Jacobberger & Smith building
 National Register of Historic Places listings in Northeast Portland, Oregon

References

External links
 

2004 establishments in Oregon
Event venues on the National Register of Historic Places in Oregon
Music venues in Portland, Oregon
National Register of Historic Places in Portland, Oregon
Northeast Portland, Oregon
Portland Historic Landmarks
Eliot, Portland, Oregon